The Female Cop is a 1914 American silent comedy film featuring Oliver Hardy.

Plot

Cast
 Mae Hotely as Myra McGinnis
 Julia Calhoun as Mrs. Brown
 Oliver Hardy (as Babe Hardy)

See also
 List of American films of 1914
 Oliver Hardy filmography

References

External links

1914 films
1914 comedy films
1914 short films
Silent American comedy films
American black-and-white films
American silent short films
American comedy short films
Films directed by Jerold T. Hevener
1910s American films
1910s English-language films